Nasir may refer to:
 Nasir, Shushtar, Khuzestan Province
 Nasir, South Khorasan